Spring Mill State Park is a  state park in the state of Indiana. It contains a settler's village, the Gus Grissom Memorial (with the accompanying Gemini 3 space capsule), a nature's center, and campgrounds.

The park is located on the Mitchell Karst Plain, which allowed the park's caves and sinkholes to form in the limestone. The caves include Bronson Cave, Twin Caves, Shawnee Cave (Donaldson Cave), Hamer Cave, and others. A boat tour of Twin Caves is run by the Indiana Department of Natural Resources, which travels about  into the cave.

A portion of the park is virgin timber, protected in the Donaldson Woods Nature Preserve. The Mitchell Karst Plain Nature Preserve is notable for its large number of sinkholes, more than 1000 per square mile. Many of the park's features were constructed by the Civilian Conservation Corps in the 1930s, including the Spring Mill Inn, Spring Mill Lake, and most of the trails. The park attracts about 675,000 visitors annually.

The park is 1 of 14 Indiana State Parks that are in the path of totality for the 2024 solar eclipse, with the park experiencing 3 minutes and 21 seconds of totality.

Pioneer village
A pioneer village can also be found in a valley in the park, featuring a historic watermill and nineteen other structures. A stream runs through the village, which is fed by a spring in Hamer Cave and powers the watermill. Heritage interpreters demonstrate crafts and skills from the 1860s. The Hamer Cemetery is located south of the village.  The area,  total, was purchased for the state park from a cement company for a single dollar.  Constant flowing water allowed watermills to be erected anywhere.  Restoration of the village was spearheaded by Richard Lieber and E.Y. Guernsey (employed by Indiana's Department of Conservation) in the late 1920s and early 1930s.

Gus Grissom Memorial
Also of interest is a memorial to Mitchell, Indiana-native, Gus Grissom, one of the original Mercury Seven astronauts, who died in the Apollo 1 accident. The memorial features the spacecraft from Grissom's Gemini 3 space flight, nicknamed by Grissom the Molly Brown (after the play The Unsinkable Molly Brown), as well as a short video about the life of Grissom, and artifacts such as a spacesuit, helmet, and many personal effects.

Other
A Nature Center is open from spring through fall and features live snakes, a bird-watching window, natural history displays, and a children's area. During the winter, a small Nature Nook is available instead at the Spring Mill Inn.

The campground features 188 Class A campsites which include 30 amp electric service, a fire ring, and a picnic table for each site. Thirty-five primitive campsites and youth camping are also available. Four "comfort stations" are located in the campground, which includes modern plumbing, restrooms, and showers. A camp store is accessible from both inside and outside the campground.

In popular culture
The park was the subject of a Rescue 911 segment that aired on October 17, 1989, about a man that became trapped and was later rescued in Donaldson Cave.

Gallery

References

Indiana Department of Natural Resource's official Web page

External links 

 Official DNR Web page for Spring Mill State Park
 Spring Mill State Park collection, Rare Books and Manuscripts, Indiana State Library

Canyons and gorges of Indiana
Civilian Conservation Corps in Indiana
Grinding mills in Indiana
State parks of Indiana
Living museums in Indiana
Mill museums in Indiana
Museums in Lawrence County, Indiana
Protected areas of Lawrence County, Indiana
Nature centers in Indiana
Bodies of water of Lawrence County, Indiana